Onisifor Ghibu (May 31, 1883 – October 3, 1972) was a Romanian teacher of pedagogy, member of the Romanian Academy, and politician.

Biography

Early life
Born into a peasant family in Szelistye (now Săliște, Romania), near Nagyszeben (now Sibiu, Romania), in Transylvania, Kingdom of Hungary, then part of Austria-Hungary. He attended the Hungarian language high school in Nagyszeben and then the Romanian language gymnasium in Brassó (now Braşov, Romania). Afterwards, he continued his studies at the Romanian Orthodox Seminary in Nagyszeben, where he received stipends for study at the University of Bucharest and the Eötvös Loránd University of Budapest. He also studied in Strasbourg and received his doctorate in Philosophy and Pedagogy from the University of Jena in 1909.

World War I and interwar

In 1914, after the outbreak of World War I, Ghibu fled to the Old Kingdom and, after Romania joined the Entente side in 1916, the Hungarian Military Tribunal in Kolozsvár (today Cluj-Napoca, Romania) sentenced him to death in absentia for desertion.

In December 1916, after the occupation of Bucharest by the Central Powers, he and his family took refuge at Iaṣi. In March 1917, he moved to Bessarabia, which was part of the Russian Empire after 1812 (before 1812 it was part of Moldavia).

Throughout the Romanian Campaign and the Russian Revolution, Ghibu was active in the national Romanian movement which eventually led to the creation of a Moldavian Democratic Republic, which joined Greater Romania.

Between 1919 and 1940, he was a professor at the Universitatea „Daciei Superioare” / Universitatea „Regele Ferdinand I” Cluj (now Babeş-Bolyai University), which he helped set up, together with Sextil Pușcariu. Onisifor Ghibu, also organized, the educational system for all education levels, in Romanian language, in Bessarabia from 1917 - where since 1867 the Romanian language education was abolished in all public schools - and in Transylvania from 1919.

Life under communism
Upon the close of World War II, with the outbreak of Soviet occupation, Ghibu was arrested on March 22, 1945, and subsequently imprisoned in the internment camp at Caracal, where he spent 222 days.

After the establishment of the communist regime in Romania, he was again arrested (December 10, 1956), and initially sentenced to 5 years in prison for organizing a rally of students at the seminary, which was inspired by the Hungarian Revolution and deemed an "action against the democratic people's regime of the People's Republic of Romania". Incarcerated successively in the prisons of Văcăreşti, Sibiu and Făgăraş, he was released after 2 years, on January 13, 1958. He continued to write, his death leaving tens of thousands of pages of manuscripts, mostly memoirs.
He died in Sibiu, October 31, 1972.

References

External links
 Ilarion Ţiu, "A cui este ţara aceasta?", in Jurnalul Naţional, August 29, 2005
 Onisifor Ghibu at the Sighet Memorial

1883 births
1972 deaths
People from Săliște
Romanian Austro-Hungarians
People from the Kingdom of Hungary
Members of the Romanian Orthodox Church
Austro-Hungarian emigrants to Romania
Academic staff of Babeș-Bolyai University
Corresponding members of the Romanian Academy
People sentenced to death in absentia
Romanian people of World War I
Politicians of the Moldavian Democratic Republic
University and college founders